El Gogorrón National Park is protected natural area in the state San Luis Potosí, Mexico.

The size of the protected area is 250 km2. The park is surrounded by the  elevations in the Sierras de Bernalejo and La Cuesta and the nearby Altamira River. The name of the area is coming from Hacienda El Gogorrón, who made this place a resort. On 22 September 1936 the area becomes a protected area and  national park.

Flora and fauna

Flora 
Representatives of species: Pinion (Pinus cembroides), Pine (Pinus montezumae), Encino (Quercus intricata), Oak (Quercus polymorpha), Encino (Quercus rugosa), Encino (Quercus diversifolia), (Quercus potosina), Nopal (Opuntia spp.).

Fauna 
Representatives of species: Black-tailed Rattlesnake (Crotalus molossus), Wild Duck (Anas platyrhynchos), Tecolote pocero (Athene cunicularia), White-tailed deer (Odocoileus virginianus).

References

Tourist attractions in San Luis Potosí
Landforms of Chiapas
Tourism in Mexico
Natural history of San Luis Potosí
National parks of Mexico
Protected areas of San Luis Potosí
Protected areas of the Trans-Mexican Volcanic Belt